The second season of Greek Idol premiered on 19 February 2011 and concluded on 25 June 2011, on Alpha TV.

Changes

Judges
Following the end of season one, Dimitris Kontopoulos and Maro Theodoraki announced they would not reprise their roles as judges for the second season. Kontopoulos came to the decision to walk away from the show citing the need for more time to focus on his work and music. Maro Theodraki announced she would not return as well, citing scheduling issues with her work, while mentioning that the decision was mutual with Alpha TV.

Following Kontopoulos and Theodoraki's departures, Alpha TV began actively seeking replacements. In September 2010, singer Elena Paparizou confirmed that Alpha TV had asked her to be a judge for season two, although she declined the offer saying she is still too young to judge her peers. In October 2010, it was reported that singer Elli Kokkinou agreed to be a judge for the second season. Alpha TV later announced on October 26, 2010 that the judges for the second season would be three instead of four, and would consist of Elli Kokkinou, Petros Kostopoulos, and Kostas Kapetanidis.

Hosts
Following the conclusion of season 1, Anta Livitsanou announced she would not return for the second installment. Roula Koromila was returned to host season 2.

Way to the Top 15

Auditions
In order to audition for Greek Idol, participants must have been between 16 and 32 years old. Auditions began in Nicosia, Cyprus in November 2010, and continued in Athens and Katerini, Greece. More than 5,000 people auditioned for the second season.

Recall
Judges chose 100 participants out of those who auditioned. At the recall rounds, the top 100 were narrowed down to the top 15 in three stages. During the first round, contestants were required to sing a song of their choice a cappella, with their fate being determined instantly in a sudden death scenario, narrowing down contestants to sixty. In the second round, contestants were required to forms groups, and were then assigned a song to sing in front of judges; their fates were revealed at the end of all performances, when they were split up into three rooms and learned their fates narrowing them down to thirty. In the third round, contestants were required to pick a song out of nineteen available, and perform it solo accompanied by a piano. Only six contestants could choose a specific song before it was taken off the list. After all performances, the judges narrowed them down to the top 15 which will perform in the live Greek Idol shows.

Live shows

Top 15 – Contestant's Favorite 
Each contestant had to sing their favorite song, and were narrowed down to ten. Seven contestants passed to the next round by viewer votes, while judges could save three more contestants. The guest performer for this episode was Peggy Zina.

Group performance: Jennifer Lopez featuring Pitbull "On the Floor"

Top 10 – Love Songs 
Each contestant had to sing a popular love song of their choice. The guest performers for this episode were Professional Sinnerz, Shaya featuring Mark F. Angelo, and Dimos Anastasiadis.

Top 9 – Today's Hits 

Each contestant had to sing a recently released song.

Group performance: Britney Spears "Hold It Against Me"

Top 8 – My Idol 

Each contestant had to sing a song by their Idol.

Group performance: Sakis Rouvas "Oi Dio Mas"

Top 7 – Hits of 2000-2010 

The contestants were supported by a live band for the first time and they each had to sing a song in Greek and English.

Group performance: Onirama featuring Helena Paparizou  "Fisika Mazi (Together Forever)"

Top 6 – Judges Choice 

The songs were chosen by the judges and the contestants each had to sing a song in Greek and English.

Group performance: Kings of Leon "Use Somebody"

Top 5 – Greek Hits & Dedications 

Each contestant had to sing a Greek hit as well dedicate another song to a loved one.

Group performance: Taio Cruz featuring Kylie Minogue "Higher"

Top 4 – International Hits Remixed & Celebrity Duets 
Each contestant had to sing a remixed version of a big international Hit-Song and secondly a duet with a Greek Performer.

Group performance: Lady Gaga "The Edge of Glory"

Top 3 – Midtempo, Ballads & Auditions 
Each contestant had to sing 3 songs, of which one was a ballad, the other a Midtempo song and finally their first audition song on the show.

Group performance: Elli Kokkinou "Avto To Kalokairi"; Elli Kokkinou "Itan Psema"

Top 2 – Finale

Elimination chart

References

External links
 Official website

Season 02
2011 Greek television seasons